Pre-Drink is a Canadian dramatic short film by Marc-Antoine Lemire, which won the Toronto International Film Festival Award for Best Canadian Short Film at the 2017 Toronto International Film Festival.

The film stars Alex Trahan as Carl and Pascale Drevillon as Alexe, a gay man and a transgender woman whose longtime friendship is complicated when they decide to have sex.

In December, TIFF named the film to its annual Canada's Top Ten list of the ten best Canadian short films. The film received a Canadian Screen Award nomination for Best Live Action Short Drama at the 6th Canadian Screen Awards, and won the Prix Iris for Best Short Film at the 20th Quebec Cinema Awards.

References

External links

2017 films
Canadian LGBT-related short films
2017 LGBT-related films
LGBT-related drama films
Films about trans women
Quebec films
2017 drama films
2017 short films
French-language Canadian films
Canadian drama short films
2010s Canadian films